WVUV-FM (103.1 FM, "V103") is a radio station licensed to serve the community of Fagaitua, American Samoa.  The station is located on the second floor of the Aitulagi Building office complex in Tafuna, along with sister stations KKHJ-FM and KKBT.  WVUV broadcasts from a tower located atop Mt. Oletele.  The station is licensed to South Seas Broadcasting, Inc., which is owned by Larry Fuss, Joey Cummings, Kirk Harnack, and the estate of Smitty Lutu (Lutu died in 2019).  Joey Cummings is General Manager.  WVUV airs a Samoan and Polynesian favorites music format and operates 24 hours per day.

The station was assigned the WVUV-FM call letters by the Federal Communications Commission on April 7, 2008.  It is the westernmost "W" call-sign in the U.S., the only "W" call-sign in the Pacific, the only "W" call-sign west of Texas, and the only "W" call-sign south of the equator.  The "W" call-sign dates from World War II station WVUV, which was privatized after the war.

WVUV-FM is American Samoa's Primary Entry Point station in the Emergency Alert System.

Air staff 
V103 employs all local announcers and is live for most of the day and voice-tracked in the evening and overnight.

News 
WVUV has a 3-person local news team, which is shared with sister-station KKHJ-FM. Headed by veteran News Director Monica Miller, daily newscasts are aired in both English and Samoan.

References

External links
WVUV-FM official website

µWVUV-FM
Radio stations established in 2006
Tutuila
2006 establishments in American Samoa
Samoan music